Andrew Steven “Andy” Brown (born December 2, 1972) is an American attorney and politician from the state of Texas. On November 17, 2020, he was sworn in as Travis County Judge.

Raised in Austin, Texas in Hyde Park, he graduated from McCallum High School where he was class president.

Former field organizer for the Texas Democratic Party, former campaign manager for U.S. Representative Lloyd Doggett in 2004; ran for 48th District of the Texas House of Representatives in 2006 before dropping out because of a residency issue. He was the Travis County Democratic Party Chair from 2008 to 2013. Brown has served as Finance Director and Senior Advisor to U.S. Senate and presidential candidate Beto O’Rourke.  In 1995, moved to Tegucigalpa, Honduras, where he helped with nonprofit campaign to rid country of leaded gasoline. He is fluent in Spanish.

Personal life
In 2012, Brown married nurse practitioner Sara Strother of Bryan, Texas. They have two children.

References

External links
 campaign website
 

Living people
1972 births
American people of German descent
Texas lawyers
Politicians from Austin, Texas
Texas Democrats
Colorado College alumni
University of Texas School of Law alumni
People from San Bernardino County, California
American expatriates in Honduras